Factory overhead, also called manufacturing overhead or work overhead, or factory burden in American English, is the total cost involved in operating all production facilities of a manufacturing business that cannot be traced directly to a product.<ref>{{Cite book|url=https://www.worldcat.org/oclc/277068142|title=A dictionary of business and management.|date=2009|publisher=Oxford University Press|isbn=9780199234899|edition=5th|location=Oxford [England]|oclc=277068 It generally applies to indirect labor and indirect cost. Overhead also includes all costs involved in manufacturing with the exception of the cost of raw materials.

References

Management accounting